Megacraspedus hoplitis is a moth of the family Gelechiidae. It was described by Edward Meyrick in 1904. It is found in Australia, where it has been recorded from Western Australia.

The forewings are bronzy greyish ochreous with the costa narrowly white from the base to two-thirds. The hindwings are grey.

References

Moths described in 1904
Megacraspedus